Frank Permain Vosper (15 December 1899, in London – 6 March 1937) was an English actor who appeared in both stage and film roles and a dramatist, playwright and screenwriter.

Stage
Vosper made his stage debut in 1919 and was best known for playing urbane villains. 

His extensive stage experience included appearing in his own play Love from a Stranger (1936), adapted from the short story "Philomel Cottage" by Agatha Christie.

His screenplays included co-writing the comedy No Funny Business with Victor Hanbury (1933). He also co-wrote the adaptation of G.B. Stern's novel Debonair with the novelist which opened at the Lyric 23 April 1930.  

He also wrote People Like Us, based on the case of Edith Thompson and Frederick Bywaters. Banned by the Lord Chamberlain after a performance at the Strand Theatre featuring Atholl Fleming, it remained unperformed until 1948, when it premiered at Wyndham's Theatre in London, with Miles Malleson, George Rose, Robert Flemyng and Kathleen Michael.

Death
Vosper drowned on 6 March 1937, when he fell from the ocean liner SS Paris. His body was found several weeks later on 22nd March washed up on the shores near Beachy Head. The death was eventually ruled as accidental after considerable media speculation. Several newspapers reported that earlier in the evening Vosper had been attending a farewell party for Miss Muriel Oxford, "Miss Great Britain" of 1936, in her cabin, and that he had threatened suicide if she refused to marry him. Miss Oxford reported that her last conversation with Vosper was "quite normal" and that he never threatened suicide. According to the Daily Express Fiction Library edition of Murder on the Second Floor, Vosper fell from the French ocean liner SS Normandie, while contemporary newspaper accounts and the evidence produced at the inquest stated it was the liner SS Paris.

Filmography

Actor

Screenwriter

Plays
 The Combined Maze (1927)
 Murder on the Second Floor (1929) - later adapted by Vosper into a novel of the same name.
 Debonair (1930)
 Love from a Stranger (1936)

References

External links
                          

 Portrait of the actor Frank Vosper by Thomas Staedeli at www.cyranos.ch Short biography and photograph of Vosper.

1899 births
1937 deaths
Deaths by drowning in the United Kingdom
Accidental deaths from falls
20th-century British male actors
British male stage actors
British male film actors
British male dramatists and playwrights
20th-century British dramatists and playwrights
20th-century British male writers